Monumenta Serica - Journal of Oriental Studies (Chin. 華裔學志, Huayi xuezhi)  and for the web    is an international academic journal of sinology. It is published by Monumenta Serica Institute in Sankt Augustin. The editor-in-chief was until 2012 Roman Malek and is now Zbigniew Wesołowski.

The journal was founded in 1934 in the Fu Jen Catholic University in Peking by Franz Xaver Biallas. It is dedicated to the study of Chinese culture and to the publication of academic contributions in the field of Chinese studies in English, German and French. The journal is published annually. Back issues of Monumenta Serica are accessible through JSTOR. This journal is indexed in SCOPUS.

References

External links
 Contents of Journal
 Monumenta Serica Institute

Sinology
Chinese studies journals
Publications established in 1934
Fu Jen Catholic University